The Gonçalves Dias River is a river of Paraná state in southern Brazil. It is a tributary of the Paraná River and forms part of the Itaipu Lake. The river has a length of about 100 km and drains an area of 1,200 km2.

The river is named after Antônio Gonçalves Dias, a Brazilian poet and ethnologist who died in a shipwreck near its mouth in 1864.

The river flows through several municipalities, including Santa Tereza do Oeste, Catanduvas and Três Barras do Paraná. The river is used for irrigation, fishing and recreation.

The river is also subject to environmental fragility and contamination by pesticides due to intensive agricultural activities in its basin. A recent study found high levels of organochlorine compounds in the water and sediment samples collected from different sites along the river.

See also
List of rivers of Paraná

References
Brazilian Ministry of Transport

Rivers of Paraná (state)